Mihalis Shialis (born 1934) is a Cypriot footballer. He played in two matches for the Cyprus national football team in 1960.

References

External links
 

1934 births
Living people
Cypriot footballers
Cyprus international footballers
Place of birth missing (living people)
Association footballers not categorized by position